Ante Cheng is a Taipei-born American cinematographer, based in Los Angeles. He is best known for his work on Ms. Purple, Blue Bayou and Pachinko.

Career
Ante received a Master of Fine Arts from the University of Southern California. He is a member of the International Cinematographers Guild (ICG). He has frequently collaborated with director Justin Chon in Gook, Ms. Purple, Blue Bayou and Pachinko. In 2021, he was listed on Variety's "10 Cinematographers to Watch".

Selected filmography
As Cinematographer
 2022 - Darby and the Dead
 2022 – Pachinko
 2021 – Blue Bayou
 2020 – Death of Nintendo
 2019 – The Echo Worlds
 2019 – Samir
 2019 – Ms. Purple
 2018 – Where Dreams Rest
 2017 – Gook

Awards and nominations

References

External links
 
 Ante Cheng at Rotten Tomatoes
 

American cinematographers
Living people
University of Southern California alumni
People from Taipei
Year of birth missing (living people)